Domenico Selva (?–1758) was an Italian scientific instrument maker.

Domenico Selva was from the Veneto region of north-eastern Italy. He had an optical workshop in Venice near Piazza San Marco and used his skills to develop lenses, telescopes, and microscopes. His works were documented in a book by his son Lorenzo Selva, who was inspired by his father to become an optician himself.

References
http://catalogue.museogalileo.it/biography/DomenicoSelva.html

Italian scientific instrument makers
1758 deaths
Scientists from Veneto